

 
Point Stuart  is a locality in the Northern Territory of Australia located about  east of the territorial capital of Darwin.

The locality consists of land bounded in part to the west by the Mary River, in part to the north by the coastline of Van Diemen Gulf, to the east by the Kakadu National Park and in the south by the Arnhem Highway.  The locality was named after a feature on the coastline of Van Diemen Gulf which was named in honour of John McDouall Stuart for his successful crossing of the Australian continent in 1862.Its boundaries and name were gazetted on 4 April 2007.

The 2016 Australian census which was conducted in August 2016 reports that Point Stuart  had 22 people living within its boundaries.

Point Stuart  is located within the federal division of Lingiari, the territory electoral division of Goyder and within the unincorporated areas of the Northern Territory.

References

 Places in the unincorporated areas of the Northern Territory